Crystal Island is a future building project in Moscow, Russia that is planned to have around 2,500,000 square meters (27,000,000 square ft) of floor space and a height of 450 meters (1,476 ft) designed by Norman Foster. At these dimensions upon completion it would be the largest structure (in floor space) in the world. The architectural firm behind the design is Foster and Partners.

History
The tent-like superstructure would rise to 450 m, and form a breathable "second skin" and thermal buffer for the main building, shielding the interior spaces from Moscow’s weather. This section skin will be sealed in winter to minimize heat loss, and opened in the summer to naturally cool the interior.  The building would be integrated into a new park, which would provide a range of activities throughout the year, with cross country skiing and ice skating in the winter.

It is stated to have a multitude of cultural, exhibition, performance, hotel, apartment, retail and office space, as well as an international school for 500 students. The building would be powered by built-in solar panels and wind turbines. The structure would also feature on-site renewable and low-carbon energy generation.

In 2009, due to the global economic crisis, financial backing for the project was lost, and construction of the project was postponed.

See also
 Hyperboloid structure
 List of hyperboloid structures
 Arcology

References

External links
Crystal Island at Foster and Partners

Unbuilt buildings and structures in Russia
Buildings and structures in Moscow
Hyperboloid structures
Foster and Partners buildings